Tõrva JK is a football club based in Tõrva, Estonia. Founded in 2008, it played in II Liiga in 2018. Starting from the 2019 season Tõrva JK and Tarvastu JK played together as one team. 

The team also has a reserve team Tõrva JK II, which plays in IV Liiga.

Current squad 
 ''As of 31 May 2017.

Statistics

League and Cup

References

External links

Viljandi County
Football clubs in Estonia
2008 establishments in Estonia
Association football clubs established in 2008